
Salvatore "Sal" J. LaMattina (born September 8, 1959, in East Boston) is an American politician who is a former member of the Boston City Council. He represented District 1, which includes the North End, East Boston, and Charlestown, serving from January 2006 through December 2017.

Personal life and education 
LaMattina graduated from East Boston High School in 1978 and then attended University of Massachusetts Amherst, where he graduated in 1984 with a degree in political science.

He has three brothers, Robert, David, and John.

See also

 Boston City Council election, 2005
 Boston City Council election, 2007
 Boston City Council election, 2009
 Boston City Council election, 2011
 Boston City Council election, 2013
 Boston City Council election, 2015

References

North End Waterfront: Sal LaMattina Named City Council Vice-President

Further reading

External links
 sallamattina.com via Wayback Machine
 City of Boston profile

1959 births
Living people
Boston City Council members
People from East Boston, Boston
University of Massachusetts Amherst College of Social and Behavioral Sciences alumni